is a  railway line in Katsushika, Tokyo, Japan, operated by the Keisei Electric Railway. The line services visitors to the Shibamata Taishakuten, a Buddhist temple founded in 1629, as well as the surrounding suburbs. The station numbering letter initial for this line is KS.

Overview
The Keisei Kanamachi line is one of the few single line passenger lines in Tokyo. The line is built in a packed residential area, and buildings are located very close to the track. In between Shibamata and Keisei Kanamachi station, the track runs parallels to the street of Shibamata and perfectly straight. There are only 3 stations on the line, and the only intermediate station, Shibamata Station, is close to the Shibamata Taishakuten and Katsushika Shibamata Torasan Memorial, thus being used often by tourists. 
Although being a very short line, it connects the Keisei Main line, Keisei Sky Access Line, Hokuso Line and JR Joban line together,  and it is connected to the city center at both stations at both ends, so commuting is crowded both up and down in the morning and evening.

History
The first railway on this alignment was a  gauge human powered line opened in 1899. It had 64 carriages, each seating six passengers and pushed by one person.

The Keisei company acquired the line in 1912 and rebuilt it as an electrified  gauge line.

Stations

History 
The line opened on 21 October 1913, initially running from Shibamata Station to Kanamachi Station (present-day Keisei Kanamachi).

References
This article incorporates material from the corresponding article in the Japanese Wikipedia

External links
PDF about Takasago Station.

Lines of Keisei Electric Railway
Standard gauge railways in Japan
Railway lines opened in 1913
1913 establishments in Japan

1500 V DC railway electrification